The Bureau of Normalization (NBN;) is the Belgian national organization for standardization and is the country's ISO member body.

Its name was changed in 2003 from Belgian Institute for Normalization.

External links 
 BIN home page (Flemish/French/English)

Standards organisations in Belgium
ISO member bodies
Science and technology in Belgium